West Cambridge, Massachusetts may refer to:
 An old name for the municipality of Arlington, Massachusetts
 West Cambridge (neighborhood), Cambridge, Massachusetts